Gyroscala is a genus of gastropods belonging to the family Epitoniidae.

The genus has almost cosmopolitan distribution.

Species:

Gyroscala commutata 
Gyroscala coronata 
Gyroscala mikeleei 
Gyroscala punjabensis 
Gyroscala purpurata 
Gyroscala roberti 
Gyroscala rupicola 
Gyroscala statuminata 
Gyroscala stueri 
Gyroscala watanabei 
Gyroscala xenicima

References

Gastropods